Pritam Patil is an Indian cricketer from Mumbai. Batting in one innings, stretching over 20 February 2016, scores triple century in a 50-over game an officially recognised match in Maharashtra Cricket Association's senior invitation league. Patil smashed 306 runs off 134 balls for PYC Hindu Gymkhana.

Record innings

He smashed as many as 28 fours and 26 sixes as Nanded were knocked out of the contest even before the half-way mark. During his knock as Hindu Gymkhana racked up a huge total of 594 for 6.  Many times, the balls went outside the ground. In total, new 6 balls were used in his inning. In this match, the opposite team Nanded’s batsmen too put up a dismal show getting out for just 86 runs in 18.4 overs. This gives Hindu Gymkhana an astounding 508-run victory which is the highest victory made in 50 overs match.

Recognition
Pritam's teammate Kedar Jadhav who also represented four ODIs for India gifted him an SS cricket bat, that costs around INR 25000, after his blistering knock.

References

Living people
Year of birth missing (living people)
Indian cricketers
Maharashtra cricketers
Cricketers from Mumbai
Schools cricket